The Hague choice of court convention, formally the Convention of 30 June 2005 on Choice of Court Agreements, is an international treaty concluded within the Hague Conference on Private International Law. It was concluded in 2005, and entered into force on 1 October 2015. The European Union (covering the European territory of all member states except Denmark), Denmark, Mexico, Singapore and the United Kingdom are parties to the convention. China, Israel, North Macedonia, Ukraine and the United States signed the convention, but did not ratify.

Parties under the convention recognize a choice of court agreement between parties in the field of civil law and thus courts not chosen in the agreement will stay all proceedings, unless the chosen court refuses to uphold the jurisdiction. For the convention choice of court agreements must be "exclusive", which means in the context of the convention that also a group of courts may be chosen, as long as they are in the same country. It is not required for a choice of court agreement to explicitly state that the agreement is exclusive; designating a specific (set of) courts will automatically render it exclusive.

Judgments by the chosen court must be recognized in all states where the convention is applicable.

History
The Hague Conference started with the "Judgements project" in 1996: the development of a convention regarding jurisdiction and recognition of judgements. Jurisdiction within such a convention would be classified in three categories: bases of jurisdiction which were obligatory, optional or prohibited. As the negotiators were not able to come to a consensus on such a convention, the scope of the work was reduced to jurisdiction and recognition of decisions based on a choice of court agreement between the parties. During the negotiations parallels were drawn between the New York Convention on arbitral awards: the aim was to create a system of recognition of decisions based on court cases where the court was chosen pursuant to a choice of court agreements, which would create the same level of predictability and enforceability as is the case in arbitral awards in New York Convention states.

Parties

See also 
 New York Convention on the Recognition and Enforcement of Foreign Arbitral Awards
 Hague Judgments Convention

Notes

References

Treaties concluded in 2005
Treaties entered into force in 2015
Hague Conference on Private International Law conventions
Conflict of laws
Treaties of Denmark
Treaties entered into by the European Union
Treaties of Mexico
Treaties of Montenegro
Treaties of Singapore
Treaties of the United Kingdom
Treaties extended to Gibraltar
2005 in the Netherlands